Round Trip is a 1974 jazz album by the Japanese saxophonist Sadao Watanabe with Chick Corea, Miroslav Vitouš and Jack DeJohnette.

Track listing
All tracks composed by Sadao Watanabe; except where indicated
"Round Trip: Going and Coming" (Watanabe, Y. Masuo) – 20:02
"Nostalgia" – 5:52	
"Pastoral" – 14:45
"Sao Paulo" – 7:36

Personnel 
 Sadao Watanabe - Sopranino sax & flute
 Chick Corea -  piano & electric piano
 Miroslav Vitouš - Bass
 Jack DeJohnette - drums
 Ulpio Minucci - piano on São Paulo

References

External links 
 Sadao Watanabe at discogs.com
 [ Sadao Watanabe @ Allmusic]

1970 albums
Chick Corea albums
Vanguard Records albums
Jazz albums by Japanese artists
Sadao Watanabe (musician) albums
Jack DeJohnette albums